Atila Varga (born 11 April 1996) is a Slovak football player. He plays in Italy for Sambenedettese.

Club career
He made his Serie C debut for Arezzo on 27 August 2017 in a game against Arzachena.

On 31 January 2019, he joined Siena on a 1.5-year contract.

On 7 January 2020, he signed with Carpi.

On 11 January 2021, he moved to Pistoiese.

On 24 September 2021, he joined Sambenedettese in Serie D.

References

External links
 

1996 births
Sportspeople from Trebišov
Living people
Slovak footballers
Association football defenders
Slovakia youth international footballers
Slovakia under-21 international footballers
Latina Calcio 1932 players
S.S. Arezzo players
Carrarese Calcio players
A.C.N. Siena 1904 players
A.C. Carpi players
U.S. Pistoiese 1921 players
A.S. Sambenedettese players
Serie C players
Serie D players
Slovak expatriate footballers
Expatriate footballers in Italy
Slovak expatriate sportspeople in Italy